Patrick Brown (born December 25, 1986) is a retired American football offensive tackle of the National Football League. He was signed as an undrafted free agent by the Carolina Panthers in 2009. He played college football at UCF.

He has also been a member of the New England Patriots, Minnesota Vikings, Miami Dolphins and New York Jets.

Early years
Brown attended St. Charles North High School in St. Charles, Illinois, where he played football and track and field. He was a two-time all-conference and all-area selection.

College career
After graduating high school, Brown attended the University of Central Florida beginning in 2005. As a true freshman, he started all 12 games he played in, leading the nation's freshman in that category. As a sophomore, he started 12 games again, earning honorable mention All-Conference USA honors. He started all 14 games in 2007, earning him first-team all-Conference USA honors. He started another 12 games in 2008, ending his national-best 50-game starting streak. He was again named as a first-team All-Conference USA selection.

Professional career

Carolina Panthers
Brown was signed by the Carolina Panthers after going undrafted in the 2009 NFL Draft. He was waived by the Panthers on September 5 during final cuts.

New England Patriots
Brown was signed to the practice squad of the New England Patriots on September 6, 2009. He was released on September 24.

1st Stint with the Minnesota Vikings
Brown was signed to the practice squad of the Minnesota Vikings on September 29, 2009, after center Jon Cooper was promoted to the active roster.

New York Jets
The Jets claimed Brown off waivers on September 5, 2010. Brown was later waived by the team on September 23, 2010.

Miami Dolphins
Two days before facing divisional rival, the New York Jets, the Dolphins would claim Brown off waivers on September 24, 2010.

Brown was waived by the Dolphins on November 9, 2010.

2nd stint with the Minnesota Vikings
After passing through waivers Brown was signed back to the Vikings Practice Squad. After a season-ending injury to Offensive Guard Anthony Herrera, Brown was activated to the 53-man Active list on November 24.

References

External links
Miami Dolphins bio
Carolina Panthers bio
UCF Knights bio

1986 births
Living people
People from St. Charles, Illinois
Players of American football from Illinois
American football offensive tackles
UCF Knights football players
Carolina Panthers players
New England Patriots players
Minnesota Vikings players
New York Jets players
Miami Dolphins players